Wu Ji (born 14 August 1978) is a male triple jumper from PR China. His personal best jump is 17.04 metres, achieved in November 2001 in Guangzhou.

Achievements

References

1978 births
Living people
Chinese male triple jumpers
Athletes (track and field) at the 2002 Asian Games
Asian Games competitors for China